Washington Township is one of fourteen townships in Shelby County, Indiana. As of the 2010 census, its population was 1,237 and it contained 520 housing units.

Washington Township was organized in 1845.

Geography

Unincorporated towns
 Flat Rock
 Lewis Creek
 Norristown

References

External links
 Indiana Township Association
 United Township Association of Indiana

Townships in Shelby County, Indiana
Townships in Indiana